The 1969–70 Football League season was Birmingham City Football Club's 66th in the Football League and their 28th in the Second Division. They made a poor start, suffering seven defeats in the first nine matches, but an improved second half of the season led to a seventh-place finish in the 22-team division. They entered the 1969–70 FA Cup in the third round proper, reaching the fifth round in which they lost to Manchester United after a replay, and were beaten by Chelsea in their opening second-round match in the League Cup.

Twenty-three players made at least one appearance in nationally organised first-team competition, and there were twelve different goalscorers. Midfielder Johnny Vincent played in 46 of the 48 first-team matches over the season. Fred Pickering and Phil Summerill finished as joint leading goalscorers with 17 goals in all competitions; the best goal return in League competition was Summerill's 16.

Football League Second Division

On 7 September 1968, the home match against Huddersfield Town saw Geoff Vowden become the first substitute to score a hat-trick in a Football League match.

 Note that Birmingham were in sixth place in the division after their last match of the season, played on 19 April, but not every team completed their fixtures on that date. By the time all matches had been played, on 30 April, they had dropped to seventh.

League table (part)

FA Cup

League Cup

Appearances and goals

Numbers in parentheses denote appearances as substitute.
Players with name struck through and marked  left the club during the playing season.

See also
Birmingham City F.C. seasons

References
General
 
 
 Source for match dates and results: 
 Source for lineups, appearances, goalscorers and attendances: Matthews (2010), Complete Record, pp. 372–73.
 Source for kit: "Birmingham City". Historical Football Kits. Retrieved 22 May 2018.

Specific

Birmingham City F.C. seasons
Birmingham City